All Me is the fifth studio album by Filipino TV host, actress-singer Toni Gonzaga and her fourth on Star Records, released on July 16, 2010 in the Philippines in CD and VCD formats and digital download. The carrier single released is "All Me" accompanied with music video directed by Paul Soriano. This is the first ever album magazine that include picture and article about herself. The album was targeted released in other Asian countries such as Malaysia, Singapore, Indonesia, Thailand, Korea, Japan, Taiwan and Hong Kong.

Background
All Me contains 13 tracks of original OPM composition produced by Jonathan Manalo and 5 music videos whose directed by Paul Soriano. It is Toni's fifth album under Star Records and was released on July 16, 2010. Gonzaga also revealed that she gave her ideas in creating the album "Marami [akong contribution] kasi itong album na ito is a collaboration and teamwork talaga ng Star Records and me. I am thankful na hinihingan ako ng suggestions and opinions ng Star Records for the album.". She included her collaborated composition with Jonathan Manalo entitled, You Make Me Feel.

The launching of the album was held at the noon-time variety show ASAP XV and performed All Me and Can't Help Myself together with Nikki Gil and Karylle.

Singles
All Me was the lead single of the album. It was noticed that this song was the only dance beat tune in the entire album. The sound and beat of the track was compared to 2NE1's hit, Fire. But All Me's being distant in sound and genre to other tracks from the album, it came to over-all result of the best of the entire album.

Can't Help Myself was the second release single off the album. The single gained heavy airplays and became the biggest hit from the album being able to enter various music chart in entire country.

I Love You So was released in 4th quarter of 2010 served as the third single replacing Only With You that supposed to be the third. But due to higher demand of the latter. It was decided to send it in radio and television programs for earlier release. The song was used as the theme song of Chinese series, I Love You So (Autumn Concerto). This single received heavy rotation of airplay both in radios and television.

Both Only With You and Say You Love Me were released as the 4th and final singles from the album but failed to enter any charts in radios and television.

Chart performance
In November 2011 the album sells 7,500+ and awarded gold certified by Philippine Association of the Record Industry (PARI) during the ASAP 24k Awards. In July 2012 the album sold 13,000 copies. As of August 2018, it sold 17,000 units in the Philippines.

Track listing
Disc 1

Disc 2 (VCD)

 track 7 - "I Love You So" was used as the theme song of the Taiwanese series, Autumn's Concerto, starring Vaness Wu and Ady An when it was shown in the Philippines.

Personnel
Credits taken from Titik Pilipino
 Malou N. Santos – executive producer
 Annabelle R. Borja – executive producer
 Jonathan Manalo – all-over producer
 Rox B. Santos – associate album producer
 Roxy Liquigan – star adprom head
 Nixon Sy – star adprom head for audio
 Peewee Apostol – head, Star Songs, Inc.
 Beth Faustino – music copyright coordinator
 Patrick Kevin Cabreba IV – album design
 Doc Marlon Pecjo – photography
 Pam Quiones – stylist
 Krist Bansuelo – make-up
 Macy Dionisio – hair & make-up

Music video personnel
 Producer/Director – Paul Soriano
 Concepts and Creative team – Paul Soriano/Toni Gonzaga/Mark Victor/Fabienne Bucher
 Photography Director – Anne Manson
 Production Manager – Erick Malaya
 Production Designer – Sheen Seckts
 Editors – Mark Victor/Fabienne Bucher
 Make-up Artist – Krist Bensuela
 Hair Dresser – Macy Dionisio
 Stylist – Pam Quinones

Certifications

References 

2010 albums
Toni Gonzaga albums
Star Music albums